Theumella is a genus of Ethiopian ground spiders that was first described by Embrik Strand in 1906.  it contains only two species, found only in Ethiopia: T. penicillata and T. typica. Originally placed with the long-spinneret ground spiders, it was transferred to the ground spiders in 2018.

See also
 List of Gnaphosidae species

References

Endemic fauna of Ethiopia
Araneomorphae genera
Gnaphosidae
Spiders of Africa
Taxa named by Embrik Strand